Francisco Vázquez may refer to:
Francisco Vásquez de Coronado (c. 1510–1554), Spanish conquistador
Francisco Vázquez Gómez (1860–1933), Mexican personal physician and politician
Francisco H. Vázquez (born 1949), Mexican-American scholar and public intellectual
Fran Vázquez (born 1983), Spanish basketball player
Francisco Vázquez (cyclist) (born 1952), Mexican Olympic cyclist
Francisco Vázquez Vázquez (born 1946), Spanish politician and ambassador